Isophlebia is an extinct genus of fossil odonates belonging to the family Isophlebiidae.

These fast-moving volant carnivore-insectivores lived during the Jurassic period of Germany, from 150.8 to 145.5 Ma.

Species
 †Isophlebia aspasia Hagen, 1866

References

GBIF
Hagen HA (1866). "Die Neuroptera des lithographischen Schiefers in Bayern. Pars I: Tarsophlebia, Isophlebia, Stenophlebia, Anax". Palaeontographica 15: 57–96.

External links
Getty Images

Prehistoric Odonata genera
Late Jurassic insects
Fossils of Germany
Fossil taxa described in 1866